Chen Su-yu (born 19 December 1997) is a Taiwanese female badminton player.

Achievements

BWF International Challenge/Series (1 title, 2 runners-up)
Women's Singles

 BWF International Challenge tournament
 BWF International Series tournament
 BWF Future Series tournament

References

External links
 

1997 births
Living people
Taiwanese female badminton players
21st-century Taiwanese women